The 2002 Major League Baseball postseason was the playoff tournament of Major League Baseball for the 2002 season. The winners of the League Division Series would move on to the League Championship Series to determine the pennant winners that face each other in the World Series. 

In the American League, the Anaheim Angels, formerly known as the California Angels, returned to the postseason for the first time since 1986. Joining them were the New York Yankees, who made their eighth straight postseason appearance, the Oakland Athletics, who returned for the third year in a row, and the Minnesota Twins, who made their first appearance since 1991. 

In the National League, the San Francisco Giants returned for the second time in three years, the Arizona Diamondbacks returned for the third time in four years, the St. Louis Cardinals returned for the third straight time, and the Atlanta Braves made their eleventh consecutive appearance.

The postseason began on October 1, 2002, and ended on October 27, 2002, with the Angels defeating the Giants in seven games in the 2002 World Series to win their first World Series title in franchise history. This was the first World Series to feature both Wild Card teams from the American and National Leagues. It was also the last World Series to feature two teams from the same state.

Playoff seeds
The following teams qualified for the postseason:

American League
 New York Yankees - 103–58, Clinched AL East
 Oakland Athletics - 103–59, Clinched AL West
 Minnesota Twins - 94–67, Clinched AL Central
 Anaheim Angels - 99–63, Clinched Wild Card

National League
 Atlanta Braves - 101–59, Clinched NL East
 Arizona Diamondbacks - 98–64, Clinched NL West
 St. Louis Cardinals - 97–65, Clinched NL Central
 San Francisco Giants - 95–66, Clinched Wild Card

Playoff bracket

American League Division Series

(1) New York Yankees vs. (4) Anaheim Angels 

This was the first postseason meeting between the Angels and Yankees. The Angels knocked off the four-time defending American League champion Yankees in 4 games to reach the ALCS for the first time since 1986. This was the first playoff series win in franchise history for the Angels. While the Yankees unsurprisingly took Game 1, the Angels prevailed in a high scoring Game 2 to tie the series going into Anaheim. The Angels scored nine runs in Games 3 and 4 to take the series and advance.

The Angels and Yankees would also meet in the 2005 ALDS (Angels victory) and the 2009 ALCS (Yankees victory).

(2) Oakland Athletics vs. (3) Minnesota Twins 

This was the first postseason meeting between the Twins and Athletics. The Twins defeated the Athletics in five games to return to the ALCS for the first time since 1991. In Oakland, the first two games were split by both teams. When the series moved to Minneapolis, the Athletics won Game 3 by a 6-3 score to go up 2-1 in the series. In Game 4, the Twins blew out the Athletics to send the series back to Oakland for a Game 5, which the Twins narrowly won by one run.

Both teams would meet again in the ALDS in 2006, which the Athletics won in a sweep.

As of 2023, this is the last time the Twins won a playoff series.

National League Division Series

(1) Atlanta Braves vs. (4) San Francisco Giants 

This was the first postseason meeting between the Giants and Braves. The Giants knocked off the top-seeded Braves in five games to advance to the NLCS for the first time since 1989. In Atlanta, both teams split the first two games. When the series moved to San Francisco, the Braves blew out the Giants in Game 3 to go up 2-1 in the series. However, the Giants responded with a blowout win of their own in Game 4 to send the series back to Atlanta. The Giants narrowly took Game 5 to advance to the NLCS.

They would meet again in the NLDS in 2010, which the Giants also won.

(2) Arizona Diamondbacks vs. (3) St. Louis Cardinals 

This was the second straight postseason meeting between the Cardinals and D-Backs. They met in the 2001 the previous year, which the D-Backs won in five games. The Cardinals swept the defending World Series champion D-Backs to advance to the NLCS for the second time in three years. The Cardinals blew out the D-Backs in Game 1, and defeated them narrowly in Game 2 to go up 2-0 headed back to St. Louis. In Game 3, the Cardinals prevailed by a 6-3 score to advance to the NLCS.

The D-Backs would not return to the postseason again until 2007.

American League Championship Series

(3) Minnesota Twins vs. (4) Anaheim Angels 

After three previous failed attempts, the Angels finally broke through, as they defeated the Twins in five games to advance to the World Series for the first time in franchise history. In Minneapolis, the first two games were split by both teams. When the series moved to Anaheim for Game 3, the Angels narrowly won to go up 2-1 in the series. They then blew out the Twins in Games 4 and 5 to secure the pennant.

After the series loss, the Twins would go on to win the American League Central in three of the next four seasons, although they would lose in the ALDS each time. The Angels returned to the ALCS in 2005 and 2009, but they would lose both to the Chicago White Sox and New York Yankees respectively.

While the Angels and Twins experienced regular-season success in the following years, 2002 marked a high point for both franchises. To date, this is the only pennant win by the Angels, while this is the last ALCS appearance by the Twins. In 2020, the Twins set a mark of postseason futility when they lost their 18th straight playoff game, setting a record for major professional sports in North America.

National League Championship Series

(3) St. Louis Cardinals vs. (4) San Francisco Giants 

This was a rematch of the 1987 NLCS, which the Cardinals won in seven games. This time, the Giants defeated the Cardinals in five games and advanced to the World Series for the first time since 1989. The Cardinals and Giants would meet in the NLCS again, in 2012 and 2014, and both times the Giants won.

The Giants would win their next NL pennant in 2010, against the Philadelphia Phillies in six games. The Cardinals returned to the NLCS in 2004, where they defeated the Houston Astros in seven games before falling in the World Series to the Boston Red Sox.

2002 World Series

(AL4) Anaheim Angels vs. (NL4) San Francisco Giants 

This was the first of six consecutive World Series to feature at least one Wild Card team.

This was the first all-California World Series since 1989 and the last to feature two teams from the same state. It was also the third World Series between teams from the San Francisco Bay Area and the Greater Los Angeles area (1974, 1988). The Angels defeated the Giants in seven games to win their first (and only) title in franchise history. 

The Giants stole Game 1 on the road by holding off a late Angels rally. Game 2 was a slugfest which the Angels won, 11-10, to even the series headed to San Francisco. In Game 3, the Angels blew out the Giants to go up 2-1 in the series, while the Giants narrowly took Game 4 by one run to even the series. In Game 5, the Giants embarrassed the Angels in a 16-4 blowout to be one win away from their first World Series title since 1954. Game 6 became famous for a late Angels rally in which the team scored 3 runs in both the seventh and eighth innings to overcome a 5-0 Giants lead to force a Game 7. In Game 7, the Giants struck first with one run in the top of the second, however the Angels tied the game in the bottom of the inning. The Angels then took the lead for good with a three-run third inning, and the strong Angels bullpen led by closer Troy Percival closed out the series in the top of the ninth despite putting two runners on base. The Angels made MLB history in Game 7 as John Lackey became the first rookie pitcher to win a World Series Game 7 since 1909.

Due to the Angels claiming the championship in Game 7, the Game 6 collapse entered baseball lore as part of the Curse of Coogan's Bluff superstition used to explain the Giants' championship drought after the 1954 World Series. As of 2023, this is the last time the Giants lost in the World Series.

Along with the Los Angeles Lakers winning the 2002 NBA Finals, the Greater Los Angeles area had NBA and World Series champions in the same season or calendar year for the first time since the Dodgers and Lakers did so in 1988. This was the first World Series to feature two Wild Card teams, a phenomenon that would repeat once more, in 2014, another World Series that featured the Giants.

The Giants would break through in 2010, where they defeated the Texas Rangers in five games to win their first title since 1954.

References

External links
 League Baseball Standings & Expanded Standings - 2002

 
Major League Baseball postseason